Cloniocerus lamellicornis is a species of beetle in the family Cerambycidae. It was described by Breuning in 1950. It is known from Kenya.

References

Lamiinae
Beetles described in 1950